The Royal Danish Ballet is an internationally renowned classical ballet company, based at the Royal Danish Theatre in Kongens Nytorv, Copenhagen, Denmark. It is one of the oldest ballet companies in the world and originates from 1748, when the Royal Danish Theatre was founded. It was finally organized in 1771 in response to the great popularity of French and Italian styles of dance. The company was founded with the opening of the Royal Danish Theatre, which has served as its home since that time. The Royal Danish Ballet school was founded in 1771 under the French ballet teacher Pierre Laurent (1730–1807), Then Vincenzo Galeotti developed it and August Bournonville founded his methodology for the school.

History

From the outset, the Royal Danish Ballet employed some of the leading French and Italian dancers and choreographers. Within a few years of its founding, in 1771, the Royal Theater Ballet School or Royal Danish Ballet school was established to provide native dancers, of which one of the first was Anine Frølich. One of its early masters, Vincenzo Galeotti, is considered the veritable founder of the company. He was master of the company from 1775 to 1816, and introduced ballet d'action and prepared for the advent of romantic ballet. Galeotti is credited with choreographing Amors og Balletmesterens Luner (The Whims of Cupid and the Ballet Master), which is still part of the company's repertoire and is the world's oldest ballet still performed with its original choreography.

Another major master of the troupe was the Danish dancer August Bournonville. During the half-century that Bournonville led the company (1828–1879), he choreographed some fifty ballets, of which about a dozen are still part of the company's repertoire. The works are highly influenced by the French school of dance, since Bournonville studied in that country, and include key roles for male dancers, undoubtedly written with himself in mind. After his death, one of his successors, Hans Beck, used the basic steps he learned in Bournonville's classes to create the Bournonville school to teach contemporary dancers the tradition of the old master.

The third great period of the Danish Royal Ballet came in 1932, when Harald Lander took over the helm of the corps.  Trained in the United States and the Soviet Union, he both adapted traditional ballets and choreographed original works for the company. He encouraged local choreographers, who went on to create prominent works that won international acclaim. Among them was Børge Ralov, who choreographed the first modern Danish Ballet, The Widow in the Mirror, in 1934. He also trained many prominent international dancers, including Erik Bruhn.

A prominent company director was Henning Kronstam (1978–1982), who directed the 1979 Bournonville Festival.

In the latter half of the 20th century, the Royal Danish Ballet underwent another transformation, with many internationally prominent choreographers, including George Balanchine, commissioned to work with it. Though modern works assumed increasingly important stature in the repertoire, the ballet continued to remain loyal to its classical roots as well, earning it the reputation as one of the finest corps of dancers in the world, incorporating foreign as well as native-born talent.

In 2007 the appointment of New York City Ballet principal dancer Nikolaj Hübbe as artistic director was announced.

Artistic directors 

1748–1753 Des Larches
1755–1756 Neudin
1756–1763 Antonio Como
1763–1767 Antonio Sacco
1767–1768 Jean Rean the Jelly Bean 
1768–1770 Innocente Gambuzzi
1770–1771 Martini
1771–1772 Vincenzo Piatolli
1772–1773 Domenico Andriani
1773–1775 Vincenzo Piatolli
1775–1816 Vincenzo Galeotti
1816–1823 Antoine Bournonville
1823–1830 Pierre Larcher 
1830–1877 August Bournonville
1877–1890 Ludvig Gade
1890–1894 Emil Hansen
1894–1915 Hans Beck
1915–1928 Gustav Uhlendorff
1928–1930 Kaj Smith
1930–1932 Victor Schiøler
1932–1951 Harald Lavender
1951–1956 Niels Bjørn Larsen
1956–1958 Frank Schaufass
1958–1960 Henning Rohde
1961–1966 Niels Bjørn Larsen
1966–1978 Flemming Flindt
1978–1985 Henning Kronstam
1985–1994 Frank Andersen
1994–1995 Peter Schaufuss
1995–1997 Johnny Eliasen
1997–1999 Maina Gielgud
1999–2002 Aage Thordal-Christensen
2002–2008 Frank Andersen
2008– Nikolaj Hübbe

Dancers

Current Principal dancers 

 Amy Watson  
 J'aime Crandall
 Holly Dorger
 Caroline Baldwin
 Ida Praetorius
 Marcin Kupinski
 Gregory Dean
 Jonathan Chmelensky
 Jon Axel Fransson
Andreas Kaas

Current Soloists 

 Christina Michanek
 Alexandra Lo Sardo
 Lena-Maria Gruber
 Jimin Hong
 Stephanie Chen Gundorph
 Silvia Selvini
 Astrid Grarup Elbo 
 Wilma Giglio
 Nicolai Hansen
 Alexander Bozinoff 
 Guilherme De Menezes
 Liam Redhead

See also 
List of productions of Swan Lake derived from its 1895 revival

References

External links 

Royal Danish Theatre
Bournonville website
Photoblog by David Amzallag 
Guide to the Royal Danish Ballet Photograph Album on the Premiere of Giselle. Special Collections and Archives, The UC Irvine Libraries, Irvine, California.
Archival footage of the Royal Danish Ballet performing Konservatoriet at Jacob's Pillow, July 1955 

 
Dance in Copenhagen
1748 establishments in Denmark
Organizations based in Denmark with royal patronage
Organizations established in 1748
History of ballet